Seyhan Yildiz (born 30 April 1989) is a Swiss-born Liechtensteiner footballer of Turkish descent who currently plays for USV Eschen/Mauren in Liechtenstein.

International career
He is a member of the Liechtenstein national football team and holds 60 caps, making his debut in a friendly against Azerbaijan on 6 February 2013.

International goals
Scores and results list Liechtenstein's goal tally first.

External links
 
 

1989 births
Living people
Liechtenstein footballers
Liechtenstein international footballers
Liechtenstein under-21 international footballers
Swiss men's footballers
Liechtenstein people of Turkish descent
Swiss people of Turkish descent
Association football defenders